Iskaka is a Palestinian town located in the Salfit Governorate of the State of Palestine, in the northern West Bank, 27 kilometers southwest of Nablus. According to the Palestinian Central Bureau of Statistics, it had a population of 912 in 2007.

Location
It is bordered by As Sawiya to the east, Al Lubban ash Sharqiya to the east and south, Salfit to the south and west, and Marda, Yasuf and Jamma'in to the north.

History
Ceramics from the Byzantine era have been found here.

The village is identified with Casale Esckas mentioned in a Frankish text of the year 1244. Sherds from the Crusader/Ayyubid and the Mamluk eras have been found here.

Ottoman era
Iskaka was incorporated into the Ottoman Empire in 1517 with all of Palestine, and in 1596 it appeared in the tax registers under the name of Skaka, as being in the nahiya ("subdistrict") of Jabal Qubal, part of the Sanjak of Nablus. It had a population of 37 households; who were all Muslims. They paid a fixed tax-rate of 33,3 % on agricultural products, including wheat, barley, summer crops, olive trees, goats and beehives, in addition to occasional revenues, a press for olive oil or grape syrup; a total of 5,042 akçe. Sherds from the early Ottoman era has also been found here.

In 1870, Victor Guérin noted it as an ancient village, on a hill planted with olive trees.

In 1882, the PEF's Survey of Western Palestine described Iskaka as: "a small village with ruined towers and rock-cut tombs, surrounded by olives and standing on high ground. The water supply is from a well."

British Mandate era
In the 1922 census of Palestine conducted by the British Mandate authorities, Sekaka had a population of 127 Muslims, increasing in the 1931 census to 186 Muslims in 48 occupied houses. 

In the 1945 statistics the population was 260 Muslims while the total land area was 5,311 dunams, according to an official land and population survey. Of this, 1,309 were allocated for plantations and irrigable land, 1,624 for cereals, while 12 dunams were classified as built-up areas.

Jordanian era
In the wake of the 1948 Arab–Israeli War, and after the 1949 Armistice Agreements, Iskaka came under Jordanian rule.

In 1961, the population of Iskaka was 415.

Post-1967
Since the Six-Day War in 1967, Iskaka has been under Israeli occupation. 

After the 1995 accords, 25% of village land is defined as Area B land, while the remaining 75% is Area C land. According to ARIJ, the Israelis have confiscated 356 dunams of land in Iskaka, including land for the Israeli settlements of Ariel, Nofei Nehemia and for the Israeli West Bank barrier.

On 14 May 2021, as part of the 2021 Israel–Palestine crisis, Israeli settlers reportedly killed 23 year old Awad Ahmed Harb.

References

Bibliography

External links
Welcome To Iskaka
Survey of Western Palestine, Map 14:  IAA, Wikimedia commons 
Iskaka Village (Fact Sheet), Applied Research Institute–Jerusalem (ARIJ)
Iskaka Village Profile, ARIJ
Iskaka aerial photo, ARIJ
Development Priorities and Needs in Iskaka, ARIJ

Towns in Salfit Governorate

Salfit Governorate
Municipalities of the State of Palestine